Wayne Dirk Weening (born 15 March 1965) is an Australian former professional darts player who competed in the 1980s and 90s.

Career
Weening made his debut in 1989 BDO World Darts Championship reaching the last 16 by beating Cliff Lazarenko before losing to Bob Anderson. In October 1989 WDF World Cup Team are Russell Stewart, Frank Palko and Keith Sullivan who beating England in the Semi finals by 3 legs to 9 before losing to Canada are Rick Bisaro, Albert Anstey, Tony Holyoake and Bob Sinnaeve by 7 legs to 9 Canada is the Winner. 

In 1991, Weening on the WDF World Cup Team Australia are Wayne Atkins, Allen Kingston and Keith Sullivan.

Weening made seven BDO World Darts Championship appearances with his best performance coming in 1993, reaching the quarter-finals by beating Rod Harrington and Albert Anstey before losing to Alan Warriner. He also played in three World Masters, in 1991, 1993 and 1995, losing in the first round in each year.

World Championship results

BDO

 1989: 2nd Round (lost to Bob Anderson 1–3) (sets) 
 1990: 1st Round (lost Steve Gittins 0–3)
 1992: 1st Round (lost to Mike Gregory 1–3)
 1993: Quarter Finals (lost to Alan Warriner-Little 1–4)
 1994: 1st Round (lost to Magnus Caris 2–3)
 1996: 1st Round (lost to Richie Burnett 0–3)
 1998: 1st Round (lost to Ted Hankey 0–3)

References

Australian darts players
1965 births
Living people
British Darts Organisation players
Sportspeople from Geelong